The Fadettes of Boston (1888-ca.1920) was an all-women orchestra based in Boston, Massachusetts, and directed by Caroline B. Nichols. "The original group of six expanded to twenty by 1898" with "a first violin and director, four additional first violins, four second violins, two violas, two violincellos, two contrabassos, kettle-drums and a bass, two flutes and piccolo, two clarinets, two cornets, two French horns, three trombones, snare-drum and 'traps,' and piano-forte." The group incorporated in 1895 as "the Fadettes of Boston."

In 1898 "vaudeville manager B.F. Keith booked them into his theatres all over the United States. According to Nichols, between 1890 and 1920 the Fadettes gave over 6,000 concerts, half of them as headliners in first-class vaudeville theatres." At a concert in Pittsburgh in 1902, for instance, the Fadettes played marches, waltzes, songs and arias by Frederic Field Bullard, Daniel Auber, Karl Michael Ziehrer, George M. Rosey,  Victor G. Boehnlein and others. The group also performed at the Los Angeles Orpheum.

The performers "wore shimmery gowns." Among the musicians were Annie Andros Hawley, Mildred Rogers, and Lillian Thain (violin).  Nichols "conducted the orchestra for thirty years and trained over six hundred women for professional careers as orchestral musicians."

Images

Variant names

 Boston Fadettes Ladies Brass Quartette
 Boston Fadette Lady Orchestra
 Boston Fadette Orchestra
 Boston Fadettes
 Fadette Ladies' Orchestra
 Fadette Orchestra
 Fadette Women's Orchestra
 The Fadettes
 The Fadettes Orchestra
 Fadettes Women's Orchestra

References

Further reading

 "Fadettes took name from a Sands novel." The Pittsburgh Press - Jun 16, 1907
 Blanche Naylor, The Anthology of the Fadettes. Boston, 1937.

External links
 Johns Hopkins University, Levy Sheet Music Collection. Marie Louka (composer). The Fadettes; March & Two-Step. Philadelphia: World Publishing Co., 1904. "Dedicated to Mrs. Caroline B. Nichols, Director of the Fadettes of Boston, The Famous Ladies' Orchestra."

Cultural history of Boston
Disbanded American orchestras
Musical groups established in 1888
Musical groups disestablished in the 1920s
Musical groups from Boston
Women's musical groups
1888 establishments in Massachusetts
1920s disestablishments in Massachusetts
Women in Boston
History of women in Massachusetts